Moscow State University of Economics, Statistics, and Informatics (MESI) was a university.

History
Moscow State University of Economics, Statistics and Informatics was founded in 1932 as the Moscow Institute of National Economic Accounting, which in 1948 was reorganized into the Moscow Economic and Statistical Institute (MESI). In 1996 the college received university status and was renamed the Moscow State University of Economics, Statistics and Informatics, while maintaining the same acronym.
Recently, Plekhanov University acquired the Moscow State University of Economics, Statistics, and Informatics.

In 2014 the agency "Expert RA" included the university in the list of the best higher educational institutions of the Commonwealth of Independent States.

Alumni
Boris Nuraliev - one of the founder of 1C Company.
Yuri Ayzenshpis - Russian entertainment promoter.
Puntsagiin Jasrai - former Mongolian prime minister.
Artemy Troitsky - Russian journalist.
Dmitry Kharatyan - famous Russian actor, got his second diploma in finance and investment in 2004.

External links
 Dmitrovsky representation MESI
 Official website

Moscow State University of Economics, Statistics, and Informatics
Educational institutions established in 1932
Universities in Moscow
Schools of mathematics
Universities of economics in Europe
Economics schools
1932 establishments in the Soviet Union